The plain-backed antpitta (Grallaria haplonota) is a species of bird in the family Grallariidae.  It is found in the Andes of Ecuador and the Venezuelan Coastal Range. Its natural habitats are subtropical or tropical moist montane forest and heavily degraded former forest.

Gallery

References

plain-backed antpitta
Birds of the Ecuadorian Andes
Birds of the Venezuelan Coastal Range
plain-backed antpitta
plain-backed antpitta
Taxonomy articles created by Polbot